The 2002 San Marino Grand Prix (formally the XXII Gran Premio di San Marino) was a Formula One motor race held on 14 April 2002 at the Autodromo Enzo e Dino Ferrari, Imola, Emilia-Romagna, Italy. The race, contested over 62 laps, was the fourth race of the 2002 Formula One season and was won by Michael Schumacher driving a Ferrari. Schumacher's teammate Rubens Barrichello finished second, and his brother Ralf Schumacher finished third in a Williams-BMW. It was the first one-two finish of the season for Ferrari and the first one-two for the team at Imola since 1982.

Classification

Qualifying

Race

Championship standings after the race 

Drivers' Championship standings

Constructors' Championship standings

Note: Only the top five positions are included for both sets of standings.

References

San Marino Grand Prix
San Marino Grand Prix
San Marino Grand Prix
April 2002 sports events in Europe